The Will Geer Theatricum Botanicum, named for the English botanist John Parkinson's herbal, Theatrum Botanicum (1640), is an open-air theater founded in Topanga Canyon, near The Getty Villa by Will Geer in 1973. 

In the 1950s, Geer was blacklisted for refusing to testify before the House Committee on Un-American Activities. He had to sell his large Santa Monica home and move his family to a small plot in the canyon where they could grow their own produce. Geer's friend Woody Guthrie had a small shack on the property. They unintentionally founded what became an artists' colony. Since its founding in 1973, the Geer family has continued to operate the Will Geer Theatricum Botanicum. 

Geer's former wife, Herta Ware, helped develop the outdoor summer theatre and continued to appear in plays there after her husband's death in 1978. The company features Shakespeare, as well as modern and contemporary authors. The theater, set in the natural amphitheater of a mountain canyon, is also used for occasional concerts.

Will Geer combined his acting and botanical careers at the Theatricum, by making sure that every plant mentioned in Shakespeare was grown there. Geer's ashes are at the site along with a bust in his likeness. Ware's ashes are there, as well.

History
The beginnings of the Theatricum Botanicum stretch back to the early 1950s when Will Geer, one of the many actors victimized by the McCarthy era blacklisting, opened a theatre for blacklisted actors and folk singers on his Topanga property. He also cultivated a large garden and, unable to find work in Hollywood, Geer and his family earned a living by selling vegetables, fruit, herbs, and theatre. 

With the advent of television's The Waltons and subsequent popularity of his portrayal of Grandpa, in 1973 Geer re-gathered his family (who were now working actors at theatres across the country) and together they formed a non-profit corporation, The Will Geer Theatricum Botanicum. Audiences flocked to free workshop performances of Shakespeare, folk plays, and concerts featuring such well-known artists as Pete Seeger, Arlo Guthrie, Della Reese, and Burl Ives, among others.

At Geer's death in 1978, the family and a small band of players decided to work towards becoming a professional repertory theatre, incorporating educational programs and musical events. The local community and surrounding environs encouraged the theatre's artistic goals and proved their support by donating the labor and materials to begin a campaign which would expand and improve the theatre's facilities.

When the Santa Monica Pier blew down in a storm in 1983, salvaged wooden planks were used to build the main stage. 1983 also marked the first year of realizing the Theatricum's goal of providing its principal performers with an Equity contract; today the 299-seat outdoor amphitheatre is one of the few mid-size union houses in the L.A. area, receiving critical praise and numerous awards including the prestigious Margaret Harford Award for Sustained Excellence from the Los Angeles Drama Critics Circle, and the LA Weekly Career Achievement Award for Artistic Director Ellen Geer.

From 1987 to the present, eight original plays have been included in the theatre's annual Repertory of Classics which revolves around at least one Shakespeare play. Peter Alsop's Kid's Koncerts have become a regular addition to the Repertory Season, along with Theatre for Kids by Creative PlayGround, and each spring and fall the theatre is home to a range of concerts, including numerous benefits.

In past years, the Theatricum has included special entertainment in its seasons such as American Stories, a concert performance series for families, students and educators; Outdoor Cabaret for intimate evenings of words and music under the stars; the Woody Guthrie Show, the popular tribute developed and once performed by Will Geer after Guthrie's death; and pre-show discussions in a Prologue Series.

Renovation of the Theatricum's scenic mainstage amphitheatre was completed in 1997, an architectural re-design and overhaul which maintains the natural aesthetics the theatre has become known for, while enhancing the venue's comfort and accessibility. The renovation was made possible by the generous assistance of the Irvine Foundation, Weingart Foundation, and the Ralph M. Parsons Foundation.

References

External links
 Theatricum Botanicum homepage

Theatres in Los Angeles County, California
Topanga, California
Theatres completed in 1973
1973 establishments in California
Tourist attractions in Los Angeles County, California